William Francis Magie (1858–1943) was an American physicist, a founder of the American Physical Society (president from 1910–12) and the first professor of physics at Princeton University, where he had graduated (class valedictorian, 1879) and where he served for two decades as dean of the faculty. His papers on the contact angle of liquids and solids and on the specific heat of solutions were notable, as was his text Principles of Physics.

Personal views 
Magie served as the president of the Men's Anti-Suffrage League of New Jersey. In this capacity, he argued that women's suffrage would ruin the family structure, destroy gender roles, and "undermine civilization."

Selected works
Magie, William Francis, editor, translator. (1899). : Memoirs by Carnot, Clausius and Thomson.
Magie, William Francis. (1911). Principles of physics, designed for use as a textbook of general physics. New York: Century. 
Magie, William Francis. (1935). A Source Book in Physics. Cambridge: Harvard University Press. Includes selections and translations of classic works in physics.

Notes

External links
 Finding aid for William Francis Magie papers at Princeton

American physicists
1858 births
1943 deaths
Princeton University alumni
Princeton University faculty
Anti-suffragists
Presidents of the American Physical Society